Lidköping–Hovby Airport , also known as Lidköping Airport, is an airport situated 5 km outside Lidköping, Sweden. The airport was built by the Swedish Air Force in the 1940s. It was bought by Lidköping Municipality in 2000 and is now in civilian use.

Airlines and destinations

After Golden Air moved their Stockholm–Bromma flights to nearby Trollhättan–Vänersborg Airport there are no scheduled passenger flights.

Other operations
Lidköping–Hovby Airport is home to West Air Sweden's Technical and Operations departments.

See also
 List of the largest airports in the Nordic countries

References

External links
 Lidköping Airport, official site
 Lidköping Aero Club
 
 

Airports in Sweden